The 2020–21 season was the 12th season in the existence of RB Leipzig and the club's fifth consecutive season in the top flight of German football. In addition to the domestic league, RB Leipzig participated in this season's edition of the DFB-Pokal and in the UEFA Champions League. The season covered the period from 19 August 2020 to 30 June 2021.

Players

First-team squad

Players out on loan

Transfers

In

Out

Kits

Competitions

Overview

Bundesliga

League table

Results summary

Results by round

Matches
The league fixtures were announced on 7 August 2020.

DFB-Pokal

UEFA Champions League

Group stage

The group stage draw was held on 1 October 2020.

Knockout phase

Round of 16
The draw for the round of 16 was held on 14 December 2020.

Statistics

Appearances and goals 

|-
! colspan=14 style=background:#dcdcdc; text-align:center| Goalkeepers

|-
! colspan=14 style=background:#dcdcdc; text-align:center| Defenders

|-
! colspan=14 style=background:#dcdcdc; text-align:center| Midfielders

|-
! colspan=14 style=background:#dcdcdc; text-align:center| Forwards

|-
! colspan=14 style=background:#dcdcdc; text-align:center| Players transferred out during the season

|-

Goalscorers

Notes

References

External links

RB Leipzig seasons
RB Leipzig
RB Leipzig